Stewart Alan Pike, OAM (born on 1 June 1981) is an Australian Paralympic swimmer and was born in the New South Wales city of Taree. Pike has an intellectual disability and took up swimming to overcome his life frustrations. He attended Weston Primary School and Kurri Kurri High School.
He won a gold medal at the 2000 Sydney Games in the Men's 4 × 100 m Freestyle S14 event, for which he received a Medal of the Order of Australia, and a silver medal in the Men's 200 m Medley SM14 event. In 2000, he received an Australian Sports Medal and an Australian Institute of Sport Athlete with a Disability scholarship. In 2001, he was awarded the Cessnock City Council Australia Day Sports Award. In 2006, he was an inaugural inductee in the Cessnock Hall of Fame.

References

Male Paralympic swimmers of Australia
Swimmers at the 2000 Summer Paralympics
Paralympic gold medalists for Australia
Paralympic silver medalists for Australia
Intellectual Disability category Paralympic competitors
Recipients of the Medal of the Order of Australia
Recipients of the Australian Sports Medal
People from Taree
Sportsmen from New South Wales
Australian Institute of Sport Paralympic swimmers
Living people
1981 births
Medalists at the 2000 Summer Paralympics
Sportspeople with intellectual disability
Paralympic medalists in swimming
Australian male medley swimmers
Australian male freestyle swimmers
S14-classified Paralympic swimmers
21st-century Australian people